Ala, ALA, Alaa or Alae may refer to:

Places 
 Ala, Hiiu County, Estonia, a village
 Ala, Valga County, Estonia, a village
 Ala, Alappuzha, Kerala, India, a village
 Ala, Iran, a village in Semnan Province
 Ala, Gotland, Sweden
 Alad, Seydun or Ala, a village in Khuzestan Province, Iran
 Ala, Trentino, Italy, a comune
 Alà dei Sardi, Italy, a comune
 Alabama, a state in the United States
 Alae (Cilicia), a town of ancient Cilicia

Science 
 Acetylated lanolin alcohol
 Ala of nose, in human anatomy
 Alae (nematode anatomy)
 Ala (or A), abbreviation for alanine, an α-amino acid
 Alpha lipoic acid, a nutritional supplement
 Alpha-linolenic acid, an omega−3 fatty acid
 δ-aminolevulinic acid or δ-ALA

Mythology and religion 
 Ala (demon), a female demon in Serbian mythology
 Ala (Luwian goddess), a Hittite and Luwian goddess
 Ala (Odinani), an Alusi (deity) in the Odinani beliefs of the Igbo people of Nigeria

Military 
 , a US Navy tugboat
 Ala (Roman allied military unit), a Republican-period, largely infantry, formation of 5,400 men
 Ala (Roman cavalry unit), an Imperial-period, purely cavalry, formation of 500 men
 American Legion Auxiliary
 Arab Liberation Army
 Arakan Liberation Army

Organizations 
 African Leadership Academy
 Alleanza Liberalpopolare – Autonomie, an Italian political party 
 Allgemeine Anzeigen GmbH
 American Latvian Association
 American Leadership Academy
 American Legion Auxiliary
 American Library Association
 American Literature Association
 American Lung Association
 Arizona Lutheran Academy
 Associate of the Library Association
 Association for Laboratory Automation
 Australian Lacrosse Association
 Australian Liberty Alliance, a political party

Codes 
 Åland Islands, ISO 3166-1 alpha-3 code
 Åland, ISO 3166-1 country code
 Former NYSE stock symbol of Alcatel; see Alcatel-Lucent
 Almaty International Airport, IATA code

People 
Ala or Alaa (Arabic: علاء ‘alā’) is an Arabic male given name meaning "elevation, exaltedness, highness, loftiness, sublimity" or "honor and glory, might, power, dignity" or "prestige, greatness, noble, high in rank" or "eminence, glorious, grandeur" or "high in position and status". However, the name could be used as a female given name.

 Ala al-Din Atsiz (died 1214), Sultan of the Ghurid dynasty from 1213 to 1214
 Ala al-Din Ali, last Sultan of the Ghurid dynasty, from 1214 to 1215
 Kayqubad I or Alā ad-Dīn Kayqubād bin Kaykāvūs (1188–1237), Seljuq Sultan of Rûm
 Ala al-Din Abu al-Hassan Ali ibn Abi-Hazm al-Qurashi al-Dimashq, or Ibn al-Nafis, (1213–1288), Arab Muslim polymath
 Ala ul-Haq (d. 1398), Islamic scholar of Bengal
 Ata-Malik Juvayni (in full: Ala al-Din Ata-ullah) (1226–1283), Persian historian
 Alā ud-Dīn Atsiz, Khwarazm Shah from 1127 until his death in 1156
 Ala ad-Din Tekish, (died 1200), Khwarazm Shah from 1172
 Ala ad-Din Muhammad II of Khwarezm (died 1221), Khwarazm Shah from 1200
 Ala ud din Masud, Sultan of Delhi from 1242 to 1246
 Ala ud-Daula Simnani (1261–1336), Persian Sūfī, writer and teacher
 Ala Al-Kuwaikabi (born 1980), Saudi Arabian former footballer
 Ala Al-Sasi (born 1987), Yemeni footballer
 Ala Bashir (born 1939), Iraqi painter, sculptor and plastic surgeon
 Ala Boratyn (born 1992), Polish singer also known as simply Ala
 Ala Mândâcanu (born 1954), Moldovan politician and journalist
 Ala Nemerenco (born 1959), Moldovan politician
 Ala Stanford, American physician
 Weld El 15, Tunisian rapper born Ala Yaacoubi
 Efkan Ala (born 1965), Turkish civil servant and government minister
 Hossein Ala' (1882–1964), former prime minister of Iran
 Alaa Abd El-Fatah, Egyptian blogger
 Alaa Abdelnaby, Egyptian-American retired professional basketball player, current broadcaster/analyst
 Alaa Batayneh, Jordanian businessman and politician
 Alaa Gatea, Iraqi footballer
 Alaa Ibrahim, Egyptian footballer
 Alaa Mubarak, Egyptian businessman
 Alaa Murabit, Canadian Physician, Commissioner
 Alaa Al Shbli, Syrian footballer
 Alaa Al-Zahra, Iraqi footballer

Other uses 
 Acta Linguistica Asiatica, linguistics journal
 Atlas of Living Australia, online data
 Austral Líneas Aéreas, an Argentine domestic airline
 Former airline Aerotransportes Litoral Argentino, merged into Austral Líneas Aéreas
 'Alá', the last month of the Bahá'í calendar

See also 
 à la, French for 'in the style/manner of' commonly used in English
 Al-Ala, the 87th chapter of the Qur'an
 Ala Industrial Zone, Iran, a village
 Ala dağları, a mountain range in the Taurus chain, Turkey
 Ala railway station, Pakistan
 Allah, Arabic name for God
 Alaâ, Tunisia, a town in Kairouan Governorate, Tunisia

Arabic masculine given names